Jimmy G may refer to:

 Jimmy Garoppolo, American football quarterback for the San Francisco 49ers
 Jimmy Gestapo, lead singer of hardcore punk band Murphy's Law
 Jimmy Graham, American football tight end for the Chicago Bears